Premier League Bowls was a bowls tournament staged between 2008 and 2011, set-up by Barry and Eddie Hearns' Matchroom Sport promotions. The tournament featured six world class bowls players from the World Bowls Tour (WBT) playing in a league format with two semi-finals and a final after the completion of the league stages.

History 
The first two editions of the tournament were played indoors at Potters Leisure Resort in Great Yarmouth, England. The last two editions of the tournament were played outdoors in 2010 and 2011, after the event was moved to the Athena Beach Hotel in Paphos, Cyprus, with Wyldecrest Park Homes announced as the new tournament sponsors in 2010.

Entrants 
Only both of the Scottish former World Indoor champions and Pairs partners Alex Marshall and Paul Foster competed in all four editions of Premier League Bowls.

Finals

References

External links 
 Premier League Bowls Premier League Bowls

Bowls in England
Recurring sporting events established in 2008
Recurring events disestablished in 2011